A Dawn to Fear is the seventh studio album by Swedish post-metal band Cult of Luna. It is the band's first studio album since Vertikal (2013) and first new material since Mariner (2016), their collaborative album with Julie Christmas. The album was released on September 20, 2019 through Metal Blade Records. Due to its length, most physical editions are released in two CDs.

Promotion
To promote the album, Cult of Luna released the song "The Silent Man" prior to the release of A Dawn to Fear. In support of A Dawn to Fear, Cult of Luna embarked on a 2020 tour through North America, co-headlined with Emma Ruth Rundle and Intronaut.

Reception
The album was generally well received critically. At Exclaim!, Mark Tremblay wrote an unrated review for this album saying, "A Dawn to Fear rewards its patient listeners with that they want, bringing enough familiarity but offering enough new ideas sonically that there's no risk of falling into pure nostalgia — and satisfying longtime fans of the band at the same time."

Track listing

Most CD editions are released in two discs, each containing four tracks.

Personnel
Band members
 Thomas Hedlund – drums and percussion
 Andreas Johansson – bass
 Fredrik Kihlberg – guitar and vocals
 Magnus Lindberg – guitar, drums and engineering
 Johannes Persson – guitar and vocals
 Kristian Karlsson – keyboards, vocals and engineering
Additional personnel
 Erik Olofsson – artwork and graphic design
 Henrik Oja – additional engineering
 Daniel Berglund – additional engineering
 Hugo Sundkvist – design and photography
 Alexis Sevenier – photography

Charts

References

Cult of Luna albums
2019 albums
Metal Blade Records albums